Charles Compton, 7th Earl of Northampton, DL (22 July 1737 – 18 October 1763) was a British peer and diplomat.

He was the eldest son of the Hon. Charles Compton, in turn youngest son of George Compton, 4th Earl of Northampton, and his wife Mary, only daughter of Sir Berkeley Lucy, 3rd Baronet. Compton was educated at Westminster School and went then to Christ Church, Oxford. In 1758, he succeeded his uncle George Compton as earl and was elected Recorder of Northampton. He received a Doctor of Civil Law by the University of Oxford in the following year and was nominated a Deputy Lieutenant for the county of Northamptonshire.

In 1761, during the coronation of King George III of the United Kingdom, Compton was the Bearer of the Ivory Rod with the Dove. Subsequently, he was appointed Ambassador Extraordinary and Plenipotentiary to the Republic of Venice with his introduction in May 1763, died only few months later.

On 13 September 1759, he married Lady Ann Somerset, eldest daughter of Charles Somerset, 4th Duke of Beaufort. Their only child, Elizabeth, married George Cavendish, 1st Earl of Burlington. His wife died at Naples in May 1763, and Compton survived her until October, aged only 26. Both were buried in the family's Northamptonshire vault. He was succeeded in the earldom by his younger brother Spencer.

References

1737 births
1763 deaths
Alumni of Christ Church, Oxford
Deputy Lieutenants of Northamptonshire
06
Charles
People educated at Westminster School, London
Ambassadors of Great Britain to the Republic of Venice